The establishment of AIMH was formally approved by the former Chief of Army Staff (COAS), General Qamar Javed Bajwa, on 2 June 2017, the day AIMH was officially born. The curtain raiser was held on 23 January 2018, and the foundation stone was laid on 20 July 2018. AIMH was finally inaugurated on 28 July 2021 by the then COAS. It has been set up as a semi-autonomous research body, with a broad outreach both within the civilian and military domains, and is steered by a designated governing body, the Army History Board.

The mission of AIMH 3 is to record, preserve and promote the military history of Pakistan and the history of Pakistan Army, while acting as a centre of excellence for the study of military history. AIMH is undertaking multiple tasks and roles, mainly encompassing archiving, preserving, recording and research on military history and intellectual activities such as discourse with experts, civil society and academic institutions.

Activities, events and products at AIMH have been characterised in fourteen distinct programmes, all of which are driven by the research faculty. Almost all programmes are long term and in various stages of progress, while some of these contain time-bound studies as well. Apart from offering guest lectures and running of specified modules for universities and academia, AIMH also offers a 6 weeks internship programme, twice a year.

AIMH is equipped to support its research and routine activities through a reference library, seminar/workshop halls, a multi-purpose hall, conference and discussion rooms, defence archives and an exhibition hall.

AIMH regularly publish magazines, monographs and books. These publications are an endeavour to provide readers with a diverse cross-section of articles and narrations, that showcase different aspects of military history.

AIMH is located adjacent to Pearl Continental Hotel Rawalpindi, close to the Army Museum and the Army Central Library.

For any further information, AIMH can be reached at www.aimh.gov.pk

References

External links

Pakistan Army
Military historiography
History centers